The Hispanic Health Council (HHC) was established in 1978 in response to the health care crisis in the Puerto Rican community. HHC is a nationally recognized community-based research, service, training, and advocacy organization. It is committed to developing and providing a comprehensive approach to improving the health and social well-being of Latinos and other low-income inner city populations.

History 
The Hispanic Health Council, which is based in Hartford, CT, has a long year track record of successfully translating its research findings into prevention, intervention, and community education programs. Since the founding of the HHC in 1978, the organization has grown to be the largest Hispanic social service organization in the state of Connecticut, with special expertise in maternal and child health, family nutrition, risk reduction, youth development, substance abuse, and HIV/AIDS.

Goal 
The central mission of the Hispanic Health Council is to use research to enhance the effectiveness of community intervention and education programs and to use long term involvement in the community to develop health research programs. The organization’s efforts to achieve these goals are characterized by: 
 The use of state-of-the art research methodology in identifying, assessing, tracking, and responding to emergent and enduring public health problems; 
 A commitment to community participation and an activist/involved approach to scholarship; * building broad-based community collaborators and consumer participation in prevention/intervention research; 
 Technology transfer and the creation of research capacity at the grassroots level; 
 A strong track record of both professional publication and the community dissemination of research findings through conferences, workshops, presentations, health fairs, fact sheets, newsletters, and related media; 
 A deep concern with the development of culturally and socially competent prevention/intervention models; 
 Interdisciplinary collaboration; and 
 Health policy and advocacy. The Hispanic Health Council is organized in five Centers of Excellence: Maternal and Child Health, Nutrition, Youth and Family Health and Development, Risk Reduction, and Research.

External links 
Hispanic Health Council

References 

 https://hispanichealthcouncil.org/about-us/history/ "Hispanic Health Council’s history begins before its founding in 1978 after the unfortunate death of a Puerto Rican girl. In the winter of 1973, an eight-month old infant died in the back of a police car due to dehydration."

Public health organizations
Medical and health organizations based in Connecticut